Reprise is a 2006 Norwegian comedy-drama film directed by Joachim Trier and co-written, over the course of five years, by Trier and Eskil Vogt. It is Trier's first feature-length film and the first, along with Oslo, August 31st (2011) and The Worst Person in the World (2021), in the director's "Oslo Trilogy".

The film follows a friend group of Oslovians as they navigate their early 20s, focusing particularly on Erik (Espen Klouman Høiner) and Phillip (Anders Danielsen Lie), who both harbour ambitions of being writers but whose lives take different paths.

It was the Norwegian submission for the Academy Award for Best Foreign Language Film in 2006.

Plot
Best friends Erik and Phillip, both 23, have written books and fantasize that their novels will become cult hits. However when they both submit manuscripts Erik's is rejected. Phillip's, on the other hand, is immediately accepted and a year later he becomes a star of the Norwegian literary scene.

Six months later, Erik and his friends pick up Phillip at a psychiatric hospital to bring him home after treatment following a suicide attempt. It is revealed that Phillip is suffering from psychosis which doctors believe was triggered by his whirlwind romance with Kari, a girl he met and fell in love with at an underground punk show. Still unpublished, Erik hasn't given up his dream, and continues to submit while Phillip shies away from all mention of writing. Instead Phillip tries to reunite with Kari, who on the advise of his psychiatrists hasn't seen Phillip in seven months.

Erik's revised novel finally is accepted by a publisher. He struggles to assert himself during the editing process and wonders whether he should stay with his girlfriend, Lilian, who he fears is holding him back from success. His publisher invites him to a book launch where Erik learns that Sten Egil Dahl, a reclusive writer he and Phillip both admire deeply, will be in attendance. Erik invites Phillip to the launch but Phillip is quickly overwhelmed and leaves early. Meanwhile Erik's attempt to meet Dahl is botched by another writer.

Still unable to write, Phillip invites Kari to Paris to try to recreate their first trip together. While there he obsessively has Kari re-enact the events of their first trip ignoring her discomfort. He eventually admits that he no longer is sure he loves her.
 
Erik's book is published but the publicity tour goes badly, he is met with poor reviews, and Lillian dumps him for being selfish.

After a night out with Erik, Phillip is inspired to write and immediately asks Erik for his thoughts. Erik is honest and tells Phillip it isn't his best work but has potential. Phillip is crushed and criticizes himself as a hack who recycles the work of Dahl and Ulven. After Phillip implies he thinks the same of Erik's novel, Erik angrily leaves. Going to the park he is knocked over by Sten Egil Dahl's dog and awakens in Dahl's home. To his surprise Dahl not only knows who he is but has read his work. While still critical of Erik's novel, Dahl also praises it. This renews Erik's self-confidence and he begins to contemplate leaving Oslo to concentrate on his writing.

Phillip goes to Kari's telemarketing job and tells her that he loves her. When Kari rejects him he collapses on the floor. He is taken back to a psychiatric hospital. Erik goes to visit him but cannot bring himself to meet with him and instead leaves.

Erik imagines a future in which he abruptly leaves for Paris, writing a book that creates mixed reviews but draws comparisons with Dahl's work. However his success is upstaged by the surprising literary success of another friend in his social circle, the boorish Henning. In Erik's fantasy Erik returns to Oslo for a friend's wedding. He runs into Phillip, who is happy and back with Kari, who is back in school studying psychology.

The day after the wedding Erik and Phillip meet at a café and discuss Dahl's abrupt suicide for unknown reasons. Phillip compliments Erik on his latest novel, which encourages Erik to keep going forward with his third book. Erik asks Phillip if he is still writing and he admits he is unlikely to write again unless inspiration abruptly strikes. Erik imagines a happy Phillip and Kari sitting at the café, playfully teasing each other.

Cast

Reception

Box office
The film grossed approximately $1,297,260 worldwide: $514,013 in the United States and Canada, and $647,579 in other territories—including $491,785 in Norway.

Critical response
Reprise received generally positive reviews from Western critics. As of August 23, 2008, the review aggregator Rotten Tomatoes reported that 87% of critics gave the film positive reviews, based on 69 reviews. Metacritic reported the film had an average score of 78 out of 100, based on 10 reviews.

The film appeared on several critics' lists of the ten best films of 2008:

5th - Elizabeth Weitzman, New York Daily News
6th - Nathan Rabin, The A.V. Club
8th - Keith Phipps, The A.V. Club
10th - Andrew O'Hehir, Salon

In November 2009, film critics at the Norwegian newspaper Verdens Gang named Reprise the best Norwegian film of the decade.

Accolades
Istanbul International Film Festival
 The Golden Tulip: Best Film
European Film Festival in Lecce
The Golden Olive: Best Film
Best Script
41st Karlovy Vary International Film Festival
Best Director
Don Quijote Prize
Nordic Film Festival in Rouen
Best Film
Audience Award
Toronto International Film Festival
Discovery Award
Amanda Award
Best Film
Best Direction
Best Script

Reprise was shown outside of competition at the 2007 Sundance Film Festival.

References

External links
 
 
 
 
 

2006 films
2006 comedy-drama films
2006 directorial debut films
Films about depression
Films about friendship
Films about writers
Films directed by Joachim Trier
Films set in Oslo
Films with screenplays by Eskil Vogt
Norwegian comedy-drama films
Nonlinear narrative films
2000s Norwegian-language films